Harlequin Enterprises ULC (known simply as Harlequin) is a romance and women's fiction publisher founded in Winnipeg, Canada, in 1949. From the 1960s, it grew into the largest publisher of romance fiction in the world.

Based in Toronto since 1969, Harlequin was owned by the Torstar Corporation, the largest newspaper publisher in Canada, from 1981 to 2014. It was then purchased by News Corp and is now a division of HarperCollins. In 1971, Harlequin purchased the London-based publisher Mills & Boon Limited and began a global expansion program opening offices in Australia and major European markets such as Germany, France, Italy, Spain, Greece, Netherlands and Scandinavia.

History

Early years 
Harlequin was founded in 1948 by Richard Bonnycastle in Winnipeg, Manitoba, as a paperback reprinting company. He founded the business while working at Winnipeg's Advocate Printers, a branch of Toronto's Bryant Press, as a way to keep the presses busy.

The business would be owned by Advocate Printers, Doug Weld of Bryant Press, and Jack Palmer, head of the Canadian distributor of the Saturday Evening Post and the Ladies' Home Journal. Palmer oversaw marketing for the new company and Bonnycastle took charge of the production.

Harlequin released its first book, Nancy Bruff's The Manatee, in May 1949. In the beginning, Harlequin typically acquired rights from other publishers, though a few original books were published as well. Among the novels they reprinted were works by James Hadley Chase, Agatha Christie, Sir Arthur Conan Doyle, and Somerset Maugham. Their biggest success was Jean Plaidy's Beyond the Blue Mountain (1951). Of the 30,000 copies sold, only 48 were returned.

Although the new company had strong sales in its nascent years, profit margins were limited, and the operation struggled to stay solvent. Following the death of Palmer in the mid-1950s, Bonnycastle acquired his 25% interest in Harlequin. With the company still struggling to survive, soon Weld departed and Bonnycastle, now in full control, transferred Weld's shares to secretary Ruth Palmour.

In 1954, the company's chief editor died, and Bonnycastle's wife, Mary, began proofreading books at home and took over his duties. Mary enjoyed reading the romances of British publisher Mills & Boon, and, at her urging, in 1957 Harlequin acquired the North American distribution rights to the category romance novels which had been published by Mills & Boon in the Commonwealth of Nations.

The first Mills & Boon novel to be reprinted by Harlequin was Anne Vinton's The Hospital in Buwambo (Mills & Boon No 407).

Mills & Boon partnership 
The contract with Mills & Boon was based solely on a handshake, given each year when Richard Bonnycastle visited London. He would lunch at the Ritz Hotel with Editorial Director Alan Boon, the son of Gerald Mills, co-founder of Mills & Boon. The two would informally agree to extend their business agreement for an additional year.

Mary Bonnycastle and her daughter Judy Burgess exercised editorial control over which Mills & Boon novels were reprinted by Harlequin. They had a "decency code" and rejected more sexually-explicit material that Mills & Boon submitted for reprinting. Upon realizing the genre was popular, Richard finally decided to read a romance novel. He chose one of the more explicit novels and enjoyed it. On his orders, the company conducted a market test with the novel he had read and discovered that it outsold a similar, tamer novel. Overall, intimacy in the novels never extended beyond a chaste kiss between the protagonists.

The romances proved to be hugely popular, and by 1964 the company was exclusively publishing Mills & Boon novels under the Harlequin imprint. Although Harlequin had the rights to distribute the Mills & Boon books throughout North America, in 1967 over 78% of their sales took place in Canada, where the sell-through rate was approximately 85%. Richard Bonnycastle died in 1968 and his son, Richard Bonnycastle, Jr., took over the company. He immediately organized the 1969 relocation of operations to Toronto, Ontario, where he built the company into a major force in the publishing industry. In 1970, Bonnycastle, Jr. contracted with Pocket Books and Simon & Schuster to distribute Harlequin romance fiction novels in the United States.

On October 1, 1971, Harlequin purchased Mills & Boon. This move was made primarily to secure the talents of Alan Boon and his editorial team. John Boon, another of the co-founder's sons, remained with the company as Managing Director overseeing British operations and English language exports to markets around the world, including Australia, India and South Africa.

As North American booksellers were reluctant to stock mass-market paperbacks, Harlequin chose to sell its books "where the women are," distributing them in supermarkets, drug stores and other retail outlets. The company focuses on selling the line of books as a brand name, rather than individual titles. Headed by Larry Heisey, the marketing team modelled its techniques on those of Procter & Gamble. As well as selling through retail outlets, Harlequin established a direct marketing division taking as its inspiration the systems used by Reader's Digest. Rather than traditional advertising, the company focused on giveaways. A sampling of books within a line would be given away, sometimes in conjunction with other products, in the hopes that readers would continue to buy books within that line. Harlequin Reader Service sold directly to readers who agreed to purchase a set number of books each month.

At the time that Harlequin purchased Mills & Boon, the company only published one line of category romances. The Harlequin Romance line released six novels each month. At John Boon's urging, in 1973 Harlequin introduced a second line named Harlequin Presents. Designed partially to highlight three popular and prolific authors, Anne Hampson, Anne Mather, and Violet Winspear, these novels were slightly more sensual than their Harlequin Romance counterparts. Although Mary Bonnycastle disapproved of the more sensual nature of these novels, they had sold well in Great Britain, and the company chose to distribute them in North America as well. Within two years Harlequin Presents novels were outselling Harlequin Romance.

In late 1975 Toronto Star Ltd. acquired a 52.5% interest in Harlequin, and in 1981 acquired the balance of the shares.

Romance wars 
By 1975, 70% of Harlequin's sales came from the United States. Despite this fact, the company contracted with only British writers. Harlequin contracted its first American author in late 1975 when they purchased a novel by Janet Dailey. Dailey's novels provided the romance genre's "first look at heroines, heroes and courtships that take place in America, with American sensibilities, assumptions, history, and most of all, settings." Harlequin was unsure how the market would react to this new type of romance, and was unwilling to fully embrace it. In the late 1970s, a Harlequin editor rejected a manuscript by Nora Roberts, who has since become the top-selling romance author, because "they already had their American writer."

Harlequin terminated its distribution contract with Simon & Schuster and Pocket Books in 1976. This left Simon & Schuster with a large sales force and no product. To fill this gap, and to take advantage of the untapped talent of the American writers Harlequin had rejected, Simon & Schuster formed Silhouette Books in 1980. Silhouette published several lines of category romance, and encouraged their writers to experiment within the genre, creating new kinds of heroes and heroines and addressing contemporary social issues.

Realizing their mistake, Harlequin launched their own line of America-focused romances in 1980. The Harlequin Superromance line was the first of its lines to originate in North America instead of in Britain. The novels were similar to the Harlequin Presents books, but were longer and featured American settings and American characters.

Harlequin had also failed to adapt quickly to the signs that readers appreciated novels with more explicit sex scenes, and in 1980 several publishers entered the category romance market to fill that gap. That year Dell launched Candlelight Ecstasy, the first line to waive the requirement that heroines be virginal. By the end of 1983, sales for the Candlelight Ecstasy line totaled $30 million. Silhouette also launched similar lines, Desire and Special Edition, each of which had a 90–100% sellout rate each month. The sudden increase in category romance lines meant an equally sudden increase in demand for writers of the new style of romance novel. By 1984, the market was saturated with category lines and readers had begun to complain of redundancy in plots. The following year, the "dampening effect of the high level of redundancy associated with series romances was evident in the decreased number of titles being read per month." Harlequin's return rate, which had been less than 25% in 1978 when it was the primary provider of category romance, swelled to 60%.

In 1984, Harlequin purchased Silhouette from Simon & Schuster. Despite the acquisition, Silhouette continued to retain editorial control and to publish various lines under their own imprint. Eight years later, Harlequin attempted to purchase Zebra, but the deal did not go through. Despite the loss of Zebra, Harlequin maintained an 85% share of the North American category romance market in 1992.

International expansion 
Torstar Corporation, which owns Canada's largest daily newspaper, the Toronto Star, purchased Harlequin in 1981 and began actively expanding into other markets. Although the authors of Harlequin novels universally share English as a first language, each Harlequin office functions independently in deciding which books to publish, edit, translate, and print, "to ensure maximum adaptability to the particulars of their respective markets."

Harlequin began expanding into other parts of Europe in 1974, when it entered into a distribution agreement with Cora Verlag, a division of German publisher Axel Springer AG. The companies signed a two-year agreement to release two Mills & Boon novels each month in magazine format. The books sold well, and when the agreement came up for renewal Harlequin instead purchased a 50% interest in Cora Verlag. The new joint venture format allowed Harlequin to receive more of the profits, and allowed them to gain continued distribution in Austria, Switzerland, and West Germany. As of 1998, Germany represented 40% of Harlequin's total European business.

During this same period, Harlequin opened an office in the Netherlands. Although this office lost money in its first year, by its third year in business it had accumulated a profit. In 1979, the company expanded in Scandinavia with an office in Stockholm. Expansion was rapid in both Finland and Norway. Within two years of its opening Harlequin held 24% of the market for mass-market books in Sweden. Scandinavia offered unique problems however, as booksellers refused to sell the category romances, complaining that the books' short life span of one month created too much work for too little compensation. Booksellers and distributors also worried that the uniformity of Harlequin's book covers made advertising too difficult. Instead, Harlequin novels in Scandinavia are classified as magazines and sold in supermarkets, at newsstands, or through subscription. Harlequin retains their North American-style direct marketing. Its message in Scandinavia is very similar to that of North America, but its target audience differs slightly.

The 1989 fall of the Berlin Wall gave Harlequin an opportunity to extend into previously closed markets. Cora Verlag distributed over 720,000 romance novels at border checkpoints to introduce East Germans to the company's books. The same year, Harlequin's German joint venture began distributing books in Hungary. By 1991 the company was selling 7 million romances in Hungary, and by 1992 Harlequin had sold 11 million books in a nation which, at the time, contained only 5.5 million women. At the same time, Harlequin's wholly owned subsidiary in Poland was able to order initial print runs of 174,000 copies of each title, and the Czech Republic was purchasing over $10 million in Harlequin novels each year. In 1992, Harlequin had its best year (as of 1998), selling over 205 million novels in 24 languages on 6 continents. The company released a total of 800 new titles in English, with 6,600 foreign editions.

Harlequin moved into the Chinese market in January 1995. In China, the company produced books in both Mandarin and English. Twenty titles were offered each year in Mandarin, with print runs of 550,000 copies each. An additional ten titles were offered in English, with print runs of 200,000 copies each.

International editions 
In total, Harlequin has offices in Amsterdam, Athens, Budapest, Granges-Pacot, Hamburg, London, Madrid, Milan, New York, Paris, Stockholm, Sydney, Tokyo, and Warsaw as well as licensing agreements in nine other countries.

The editors in Harlequin's branch offices have a great deal of control over which Harlequin novels will be published in their market. An editor generally chooses a book after either reading it personally, receiving a favorable review of the book from someone else, or reading a tip sheet about the novel. The editors accept a novel for one of four reasons:
Anticipated high sales
Perceived quality
A setting or topic that fits into a monthly theme
Direct orders from the Harlequin head office

The novels published overseas are not necessarily contemporaries of those sold in North America or Europe. International editors are allowed to choose from Harlequin's backlist, and books published in a particular country may have been published in North America six or seven years previously. As the novels are translated into the country's native tongue, the names of the hero or heroine may be changed and the title might not be translated literally. Furthermore, each novel is usually shortened by 10-15% from its original English version. This is usually accomplished by removing references to American pop culture, removing puns that do not translate well, and tightening the descriptive passages.

Current

In 2002, Harlequin published 1,113 romance novels, more than half of all romances released in North America. The next most prolific publisher was Kensington Books, which released only 219 romance titles. In 2006, Harlequin published books in 26 languages in 109 international markets. They sold a total of 131 million books, similar to the company's sales in 2005.

The company is considered one of the most profitable publishers. Over $585 million worth of books sold in 2003 for gross profits of $124 million and a profit margin of 21%. Its large profit margin can be tied in part to the amount of advance that its authors receive. These advances are often smaller than the industry average and can total to only a few thousand dollars for a series romance. Despite its profitability, and a 37.2% pay hike for Harlequin President and CEO Donna Hayes in 2011, the firm's royalty program for authors is controversial. In 2011, the Romance Writers Association sent a letter to all members to "exercise due diligence in reviewing contracts" with Harlequin because "several members of RWA have expressed concern regarding" Harlequin's digital royalty rate changes and non-compete clauses. This is not the first time Harlequin had been called out by the Romance Writers Association regarding Harlequin's treatment of their authors. In 2009, Harlequin was called out by the Mystery Writer's Association, Romance Writers of America, and Science Fiction Writers Association for schemes of making their authors pay for publishing.

Class action lawsuit 
In 2012, a class action lawsuit was filed against Harlequin Enterprises, Ltd. from authors alleging the publisher had fraudulently licensed e-book publishing rights at low rates to one of its subsidiaries in order to pay royalties only on the licensing fees instead of on the full sales receipts; the publisher responded that its authors "have been recompensed fairly and properly".

The lawsuit alleges that Harlequin deprives plaintiffs and the other authors in the class of e-book royalties due them under publishing agreements entered into between 1990 and 2004.

Imprints

Harlequin

Harlequin Treasury collections 
The Harlequin Treasury imprint re-released a number of titles as collections.

 Harlequin Treasury Harlequin American Romance 90s
 Harlequin Treasury Harlequin Duets 90s
 Harlequin Treasury Harlequin Historical 90s
 Harlequin Treasury Harlequin Intrigue 90s
 Harlequin Treasury Harlequin Love & Laughter 90s
 Harlequin Treasury Harlequin Presents 90s
 Harlequin Treasury Harlequin Romance 90s
 Harlequin Treasury Harlequin Superromance 90s
 Harlequin Treasury Harlequin Temptation 90s
 Harlequin Treasury Love Inspired 90s
 Harlequin Treasury Silhouette Desire 90s
 Harlequin Treasury Silhouette Intimate Moments 90s
 Harlequin Treasury Silhouette Romance 90s
 Harlequin Treasury Silhouette Special Edition 90s
 Harlequin Treasury Silhouette Yours Truly 90s

Kimani Press 

Kimani Press, which focuses on African-American protagonists, was formed by Harlequin in December 2005, with the purchase of the Arabesque, Sepia, and New Spirit Imprints from BET Books.

Silhouette Books

Love Inspired 

Inspirational romance.

Other

MIRA Books 

In the early 1990s, many of Harlequin's authors began leaving the company to write single-title romances for other publishers. To retain their top talent, in October 1994 Harlequin launched the MIRA Books imprint to publish single-title romances. Most of their early novels were written by well-known Harlequin authors, including Heather Graham Pozzessere, whose novel Slow Burn (2001) launched the imprint. For its first few years, MIRA produced four novels each month. Of these, one would be an original novel, while the other three were repackaged backlist by other Harlequin authors.

Harlequin has expanded its range of books, offering everything from romance novels under its various Harlequin and Silhouette imprints; thrillers and commercial literary fiction under the MIRA imprint; erotic fiction under the Spice imprint; Bridget Jones-style "chick lit" under its Red Dress Ink imprint; fantasy books under the LUNA imprint; inspirational fiction published under the Steeple Hill and Steeple Hill Café imprints; African-American romance under its Kimani Press imprints; male action-adventure books under Gold Eagle imprint; and single-title romances under the HQN imprint.

Harlequin Horizons/DellArte Press 
In 2009, Harlequin Enterprises announced the creation of a vanity press imprint, Harlequin Horizons.

The Mystery Writers of America, Romance Writers of America, and Science Fiction Writers of America denounced the move and revoked the eligibility of Harlequin's other imprints for their associations' conferences and awards. Following the backlash, the imprint changed its name to DellArte Press.

Harlequin More Than Words
Harlequin Enterprises operates Harlequin More Than Words, a community investment program to reward women's work in communities across North America. The company solicits nominations of women who are making notable contributions to their communities. Five women are chosen as Harlequin More Than Words award recipients each year, and a donation of $50,000 is divided equally among their charitable causes. A collection of romance-fiction short stories inspired by their lives is then written by five of Harlequin's leading authors. Authors contributing to the More Than Words anthology include Diana Palmer, Debbie Macomber, Susan Wiggs, and Linda Lael Miller. The first anthology was published in 2004, with a new volume published annually. Proceeds from the sale of the book are reinvested in the Harlequin More Than Words program.

See also
 List of Harlequin Romance novels
 Laser Books
 Lawrence Heisey

References

Sources

External links
 Harlequin homepage
 Harlequin More Than Words
 How Harlequin Became the Most Famous Name in Romance

Harlequin Enterprises
Book publishing companies of Canada
Publishing companies established in 1949
Romance book publishing companies
Free ebooks
Companies based in Toronto
News Corporation subsidiaries
1949 establishments in Manitoba
Bonnycastle family
Culture of Winnipeg